Lepidopleurida is an order of molluscs belonging to the class Polyplacophora.
The order Lepidopleurida is the oldest group of polyplacophoran molluscs 
Families:
 Abyssochitonidae
 †Acutichitonidae
 Afossochitonidae
 †Camptochitonidae
 †Cymatochitonidae
 †Glyptochitonidae
 †Gryphochitonidae
 Hanleyidae
 †Heterochitonidae
 †Lekiskochitonidae
 Leptochitonidae
 †Llandeilochitonidae
 †Mesochitonidae
 Nierstraszellidae
 †Permochitonidae
 Protochitonidae

References

Chitons
Mollusc orders